The Church of the Guanche People is a religious organisation, founded in 2001 in the city of San Cristóbal de La Laguna, Tenerife, Canary Islands, Spain. It aims to perpetuate and spread the traditional religion of the ancient Guanche people. 
 
In 2008, the Church had approximately 300 members. The Church of the Guanche People is included in the studies of minority religions in the Canary Islands.

It was founded by a group of Canarian devotees of the goddess Chaxiraxi. The Church of the Guanche People performed baptisms and weddings according to what they know of Guanche custom. On 2002, a wedding held in accordance with purported Guanche rites took place on the island of Tenerife—a practice not observed for several centuries since the Spanish domination of the archipelago.

The Church of the Guanche People has its own liturgical calendar, which officially begins with the first celebration of Achu n Magek in 2001. According to this system, this is the year 1 of the Guanche New Age.

The Church of the Guanche People is a modern pagan religious body representing Canarian Neopaganism.

See also
Germanic Heathenism
Hellenism
Kemetism

References

External links
 Church of the Guanche People. Official Website.
 Iglesia del Pueblo Guanche.

2001 establishments in Spain
Religious organizations established in 2001
Modern pagan organisations based in Spain
Guanche mythology

Religion in the Canary Islands
Modern pagan organizations established in the 2000s